George Telfer (born 6 July 1955) is an English retired footballer who played as a forward in the Football League during the 1970s and 1980s, most notably with Everton.

After making his senior debut for Everton on 22 December 1973 he went on to play for them on 116 occasions (scoring 22 times). However, he only made 3 appearances for them in his last two seasons, and then played for San Diego Sockers in the North American Soccer League.

He returned to play in England in 1981, firstly with Scunthorpe United, followed by a very short spell with Preston North End, after which he moved into non-league with Runcorn before moving on to Formby.

References

External links
 NASL stats
 

English Football League players
Association football forwards
North American Soccer League (1968–1984) players
Everton F.C. players
San Diego Sockers (NASL) players
Scunthorpe United F.C. players
Preston North End F.C. players
Runcorn F.C. Halton players
Formby F.C. players
Living people
1955 births
English footballers
English expatriate sportspeople in the United States
Expatriate soccer players in the United States
English expatriate footballers